Yosef Samuel (born July 3, 1997) is an American soccer player who currently plays for Kalonji Pro-Profile in the United Premier Soccer League.

Career 
Samuel signed to play with United Soccer League side Bethlehem Steel FC in September 2016. He made his professional debut on September 25, 2016, as a 61st-minute substitute during a 0–2 loss against Orlando City B.

Samuel joined new USL team Atlanta United 2 following the 2017 season.

Samuel scored his first professional goal on March 24, 2018, in Atlanta United 2's first ever game, a 3–1 victory over New York Red Bulls II.

On August 2, 2019, Samuel signed with Danish Superliga side Hobro IK.

Club

References

External links 
 
 Soccerway profile
 

1997 births
Living people
American soccer players
United States men's under-20 international soccer players
Ethiopian footballers
Ethiopian emigrants to the United States
Association football midfielders
Soccer players from Atlanta
Atlanta United 2 players
Philadelphia Union II players
USL Championship players
Hobro IK players
Danish Superliga players
American expatriate soccer players
Expatriate men's footballers in Denmark
American expatriate sportspeople in Denmark
United Premier Soccer League players